The 1977 All England Championships was a badminton tournament held at Wembley Arena, London, England from 23–26 March 1977.
 The event attracted sponsorship from John Player.

Final results

Men's singles

Section 1

Section 2

Women's singles
Etsuko Takenaka married and competed as Etsuko Toganoo and Nora Gardner married and competed as Nora Perry.

Section 1

Section 2

References

All England Open Badminton Championships
All England
All England Open Badminton Championships in London
All England Badminton Championships
All England Badminton Championships
All England Badminton Championships